Adams is a lunar impact crater that is located in the rugged southeastern section of the Moon, near the lunar limb. It lies just to the southwest of the crater Legendre. To the northwest are the craters Hase and Petavius, and to the southwest is Furnerius. To the southwest of Adams is a system of rilles designated the Rimae Hase. The longest of these rilles follows a course to the southeast.

The rim of Adams is generally circular in form, but somewhat worn by small impact craters. There is a slight notched protrusion at the southern end of the wall. The floor is undistinguished, with no significant protrusions, and only minor craterlets.

Adams' name jointly honours three astronomers of that name: John Couch Adams, Walter Sydney Adams and Charles Hitchcock Adams.

Satellite craters 

By convention these features are identified on lunar maps by placing the letter on the side of the crater midpoint that is closest to Adams.

See also 
 1996 Adams, asteroid

References

External links 
 

Impact craters on the Moon